Asshole: How I Got Rich and Happy by Not Giving a Shit About You is a 2008 spoof self-help book and memoir by American author Martin Kihn. The book's title in the U.S. was modified to A$$hole: How I Got Rich & Happy by Not Giving a Damn About Anyone & How You Can, Too.

Content

The first line of Marty Kihn's book, is "I was the nicest guy in the world and it was killing me." Kihn, who works for a marketing company, is told by his boss that unless he started "playing hardball", they were going to demote him and upgrade a colleague Kihn calls "The Nemesis" to a window office. So to save his career, Kihn decides to turn himself into an asshole, and in telling his story, he describes exactly how the reader can follow his lead.

To become an asshole, Kihn builds a team, consisting of an acting coach, life coach and both personal and dog trainer – to help "master the art of assholism." Kihn then creates a ten-step "assholism" program which involves "ignoring other peoples’ feelings, never saying sorry, dressing in black silk and only eating red meat." Other tasks saw Kihn signing up to the National Rifle Association, learning kickboxing, screaming at colleagues and eating garlic bagels on public transport. Additionally, Kihn takes inspiration from famous figures whom he considers "assholes" such as: Donald Trump, Rudy Giuliani, Martha Stewart, David Letterman, Ayn Rand, Nicole Kidman, Niccolò Machiavelli, Scarface and Paris Hilton. He also takes inspiration from Ayn Rand's The Fountainhead and The Virtue of Selfishness.

In speaking on his motivations for compiling the work, Kihn stated: 

In the end, he is successful. By "finding the balls to act like an asshole, he crushes The Nemesis", gets a promotion, then nets a large sum of cash, and a second home into the bargain, by selling the book to Hollywood for a six-figure sum. Warner Brothers also paid $500,000 for the film rights to his memoirs before he'd even written them.

Martin Kihn’s Ten Steps to Becoming An Asshole

Reviews
In reviewing the work, Booklist remarked that "Kihn's got a great ear for dialogue - and a comedic sense worthy of Second City", while Publishers Weekly stated that "like an above-average Adam Sandler movie, this mix of racy humor and overt sentiment will probably get both a bigger audience, and less credit, than it deserves."

Robert Sutton, author of New York Times bestseller The No Asshole Rule gave the book a positive review, declaring "A$$hole is one of the funniest books I've ever read, and "remarkably useful in a sick sort of way." Additionally, Rory Freeman, co-author of The New York Times bestseller Skinny Bitch, described the text as "remarkably profane, laugh-out-loud funny, and surprisingly sentimental", while John Alexander, author of How To Become an Alpha Male, opined that "through humor and vivid storytelling, Martin Kihn takes you through that journey until he discovers an astonishing lesson."

References

External links
 Text Preview via Google Books
 Martin Kihn Parody Infomercial for A$$hole
 Original Theme Song for the Book ~ "Too Nice Asshole"
 Video: Martin Kihn on Fox Business with Anna Gilligan
 Make Enemies and Alienate People by Brian Braiker, Newsweek magazine, April 14, 2008
 Isn't It Ironic - Not? by Martin Kihn, The Huffington Post, May 21, 2008

2008 non-fiction books
Satirical self-help books
Parody books